Jaime Jiménez Merlo (born 10 December 1980) is a Spanish former professional footballer who played as a goalkeeper.

Club career
Born in Valdepeñas, Province of Ciudad Real, Castile-La Mancha, Jiménez played lower league football until the age of nearly 25, representing mainly AD Ceuta in the Segunda División B. In the summer of 2005 he joined Ciudad de Murcia from Segunda División, making his league debut on 13 November in a 0–2 home loss against Real Valladolid; the club was renamed Granada 74 CF for the 2007–08 season.

In 2008, Jiménez signed with second-tier Elche CF. He played understudy to Willy Caballero during most of his spell in the Valencian Community, his best year being 2010–11 when he played 19 games. He added four appearances in that campaign's unsuccessful promotion playoffs, as the Argentine had already left for Málaga CF in the winter transfer window.

Jiménez moved to fellow league side Valladolid on 8 July 2011, penning a 2+1 contract. He conceded only 36 goals in 41 matches in his debut season – good enough for the Ricardo Zamora Trophy conquest– but, in the playoffs, suffered an injury in the first game against Córdoba CF, being relegated to the bench in favour of Dani Hernández after recovering.

Jiménez made his debut in La Liga on 20 August 2012, in a 1–0 away victory over Real Zaragoza. On 9 July 2014, following Valladolid's relegation, he agreed to a 1+1 deal at newly promoted SD Eibar.

References

External links

1980 births
Living people
Sportspeople from the Province of Ciudad Real
Spanish footballers
Footballers from Castilla–La Mancha
Association football goalkeepers
La Liga players
Segunda División players
Segunda División B players
Tercera División players
Valencia CF Mestalla footballers
Gimnàstic de Tarragona footballers
RCD Mallorca B players
Zamora CF footballers
AD Ceuta footballers
Ciudad de Murcia footballers
Granada 74 CF footballers
Elche CF players
Real Valladolid players
SD Eibar footballers